The Music Radio China Top Chart Awards is a music awards ceremony founded by China National Radio in 2003.

Ceremonies

Categories 
2017 Music Radio China Top Chart Awards
 Most Popular Male Singer (Mainland China)
 Most Popular Male Singer (Hong Kong/Taiwan)
 Most Popular Female Singer (Mainland China)
 Most Popular Female Singer (Hong Kong/Taiwan)
 Most Popular Album
 Best New Artist
 Campus Favorite Award (Solo)
 Campus Favorite Award (Group/Band)
 Best Male Singer (Mainland China)
 Best Male Singer (Hong Kong/Taiwan)
 Best Female Singer (Mainland China)
 Best Female Singer (Hong Kong/Taiwan)
 Best Male Singer-Songwriter
 Best Female Singer-Songwriter
 Best Album
 Best Producer
 Best Composer
 Best Lyricist
 Media Recommend Award (Solo)
 Media Recommend Award (Group/Band)
 Best Stage Performance (Solo)
 Best Stage Performance (Group/Band)
 Best Crossover Artist
 Music Radio Recommend Award (Solo)
 Music Radio Recommend Album (Group/Band)

References

External links
 

Chinese music awards
2003 establishments in China
Recurring events established in 2003
Awards established in 2003
Annual events in China